The A 28 road is an A-Grade trunk road in Sri Lanka. It connects Anuradhapura with Padeniya.

The A 28 passes through Talawa, Tambuttegama, Mahagalkadawala, Galgamuwa, Ambanpola and Daladagama to reach Padeniya.

References

Highways in Sri Lanka